The Ambassador of the Republic of Indonesia to the Republic of the Philippines is the Republic of Indonesia's foremost diplomatic representative in the Philippines. As head of Indonesia's diplomatic mission there, the Ambassador is the official representative of the President and the Government of Indonesia to the President and the Government of the Philippines. The position has the rank and status of an Ambassador Extraordinary and Plenipotentiary and is based at the embassy located in Makati, the financial center within the country's capital region.

The Indonesian ambassador to the Philippines serves as the non-resident ambassador to the countries of Marshall Islands and Palau.

Heads of mission

References

External links

Ambassadors of Indonesia to the Philippines
Indonesia
Philippines